Craspedotropis is a genus of land snails in the family Cyclophoridae.

Species 
Species in the genus include:
 Craspedotropis andrei  Vermeulen, 1999
 Craspedotropis bilirata Beddome, 1875
 Craspedotropis borneensis Godwin-Austen, 1889
 Craspedotropis cuspidata Benson, 1851
 Craspedotropis fimbrata Godwin-Austen, 1875
 Craspedotropis gretathunberga M. Schilthuizen, JP Lim, ADP van Peursen, M. Alfano, AB Jenging, D. Cicuzza, A. Escoubas, P. Escoubas, U. Grafe, J. Ja, P. Koomen, A. Krotoski, D. Lavezzari, L. Lim, R. Maarschall, F. Slik, D. Steele, DTW Ting, I. van Zeeland, I. Njunjić, 2020
 Craspedotropis juvenilis Vermeulen, 1999
 Craspedotropis salemensis Beddome, 1875
Species brought into synonymy
 † Craspedotropis resurrecta Oppenheim, 1890: synonym of † Tropidogyra resurrecta (Oppenheim, 1890) (new combination)

References

External links
 Blanford W.T. (1864). On the classification of the Cyclostomacea of eastern Asia. The Annals and Magazine of Natural History. ser. 3, 13: 441-465

Cyclophoridae
Gastropods described in 1864